Ganjabad (also Romanized as Ganjābād) is a village situated in the dense farmland of the Mokriyan-e Shomali Rural District, in the Central District of Miandoab County, West Azerbaijan Province, Iran. At the 2006 census, its population was 373, in 85 families.

References 

Populated places in Miandoab County